Liu Li Fang (born ) is a retired Taiwanese female volleyball player. She was part of the Chinese Taipei women's national volleyball team.

She participated in the 2007 FIVB Volleyball World Grand Prix. She competed at the 2002 Asian Games.

References

1982 births
Living people
Taiwanese women's volleyball players
Place of birth missing (living people)
Volleyball players at the 2002 Asian Games
Asian Games competitors for Chinese Taipei